Honfleur is a municipality of approximately 850 people in the Bellechasse Regional County Municipality in the Chaudière-Appalaches region of Quebec. The Boyer River takes its source in the municipality.

History
Founded in 1904, the municipality of Honfleur is similar to Honfleur, city in Calvados, Normandie, where many sailors came from during the 16th and 17th century to North America. The name comes from the archbishop of Quebec, cardinal Louis-Nazaire Bégin, (1840-1925) whose ancestor came from Saint-Léonard-de-Honfleur, archdiocese of Lisieux, also situated in Calvados. During this period, the civil parish was erected. The territory was part of the seigneurie Taschereau, once named seigneurie Joliette, where municipalities such as Saint-Anselme, Saint-Gervais, Saint-Lazare and Sainte-Claire were located.

Twin Town
Honfleur, Normandie

References

Municipalities in Quebec
Incorporated places in Chaudière-Appalaches